Del Webb Explosion was a seven-piece band, cast in the mold of British soul revivalists Dexy's Midnight Runners. (They) were active in Adelaide for only 20 months from 1981–1983 with their first gig being played at the Union Hotel on 7 December 1981. A brass based pop band with strong British soul influences, the band was founded in Adelaide, South Australia, by Peter Flierl who had just returned from a trip to the UK with an incredibly strong impression having been left by the sounds of Dexys Midnight Runners and the very recently formed splinter group from that ensemble, The Bureau. The band's name was provided by early Del Webb guitarist, Gerry Barrett, and was named after American construction magnate and real estate developer, Delbert Eugene Webb.  The 'Explosion' just seemed to follow.

History

Beginning
Peter Flierl (bass guitar, backing vocals, song-writing) started with an advertisement in the local newspaper 'want ads' seeking like-minded musicians to form an 8 piece soul/pop band to play a mix of original and cover songs. Drummer Heinz Stein responded early and was clearly attuned to what Flierl had in mind. Mankyboddle (lead vocals), Barrett (guitar) and Pasetto (tenor sax) were enlisted shortly afterwards, forming the nucleus of the band. Rehearsals commenced with a handful of early songs written for the band by Flierl together with several soul standards and rounded off with a generous selection of Dexys songs from their debut release, 'Searching for the Young Soul Rebels. The band's initial line-up was rounded off with the twin trumpets of Daniel Clements and Rob Symons. A debut gig supporting local favourites, The Screaming Believers, at the Union Hotel, introduced the band to an appreciative Adelaide audience and from then the 'Explosion' proceeded to gig regularly for the approximate 12 months of its existence.

Although being integral to scoring brass charts to Flierl's initial compositions for the band, Pasetto left the band prior to their initial foray into the now defunct Pepper Recording Studios in North Adelaide. Symons had also departed around this time and the band recruited Burton on alto sax and Berrington on tenor to record the band's debut single "One Way Love" b/w "Going Home". The single was released on small local label 'Empty Dogma Records' and proceeded to notch up respectable local sales bringing the band to the attention of a wider audience. The band also self-financed a film clip shot at various suburban locations in Adelaide, to further promote the song. Although not venturing beyond the outskirts of the city, the band maintained a steady gigging profile building its fan base from regular performances at inner city venues like the Tivoli and Angas Hotels as well as regular appearances at the Adelaide University Bar.

Middle
A heavy schedule of gigging from the outset created a level of interest from some of the major record labels in Adelaide. However cracks were beginning to show in the band with some members clearly not having the same commitment as others. It was around this time that Barrett was replaced by Oldman on lead guitar duties. Although still unsigned, the band decided to foray into the studio a second time to record the Mankyboddle penned "Gardening as Finer Art" backed with Flierl's "Too Late The Hero". Funds were tighter this time around for the band which resulted in a 'live' rendition of "Too Late The Hero" (recorded some weeks earlier at an Adelaide Uni Bar gig) becoming the B-side. The new single was released on local alternative record label, Greasy Pop Records and despite not having a video clip to accompany it, continued to increase the profile of the band with record company representatives. Keyboardist, Glenn Errington also left the band during this period to be replaced by Peter Flierl's multi-instrumentalist brother, Vic Flierl on keyboards at many 'live' performances by the band.
Although the band continued to receive praise for their exciting stage performances, the band seemed to have "more factions than a Labor Party conference", largely due to musical differences, commitment and direction.

End
Only 13 months into its existence and with a recording contract virtually on its door step, the band split with Flierl, Stein and Burton departing to form another band, Plan B, while Mankyboddle, Clements, Berrington & Oldman continued without them.      The band returned to public performances some 4 months later under the banner "Del Webb Explosion – Back without Geno", a clear statement that the earlier Dexys' influence which was such a major part of Flierl's basis for forming the band, was no longer in existence. In fact, when questioned about Geno at a show at the Tivoli in 1983, Mankyboddle said "Geno was dead"
 
Even though the final Line-Up didn't produce any records, it made some very good live recordings in which the new material took centre stage. According to Mankyboddle, new member Kim Webster (later New Romantics) on keyboards was an important facet of the new direction the band took. Del Webb Explosion Mark III was the attempt to forge, in this kind of band line-up, a more original band from what for a long time was essentially a cover band.The final break up in the end was due to a lack of commitment to go "professional", i.e. interstate, even though the actual band personalities and individual musicianship were much better matched. So, in the end it wasn't so much friction, as the lack of ambition of some of the new members. The reformed band permanently broke up in late 1983.

Beyond Del Webb
Flierl, Stein and Burton quickly re-grouped to form Plan B which re-commenced gigging virtually the same week as the 'new' Del Webb Explosion. Following the second and final implosion of Del Webb Explosion, Mankyboddle joined forces with Steve Z to form The Sweets of Sin, an experimental crossover pop-band with strong modern classical and jazz influences.

Members

Original
 Peter Flierl
 Heinz Stein
 Gerry Barrett
 Raimondo Pasetto
 Glenn Errington
 Daniel Clements
 Rob Symons
 Frank Moller (later Frank Mankyboddle)

Additional/Short Term
 Andy Berrington
 John Oldman
 Russell Burton
 Vic Flierl
 Kim Webster
 John Hastings
 Chris Woods

Discography
 One Way Love b/w Going Home - Single - Empty Dogma (1981)
 Gardening as Finer Art b/w Too Late the Hero - Single - Greasy Pop Records (1982)

References

External links
 SA Memory article on Gardening as a Finer Art
 Music Australia reference to One Way Love
 This was the MODern World Article on Adelaide 80's Mod scene by David Robinson
 Spencer, Chris. Adelaide bands, Golden Square [Vic.]: Moonlight Publishing, 1996–1997

Australian pop music groups
Australian rock music groups
Australian soul musical groups